Taiwan (governed by the Republic of China) competed at the 1964 Summer Olympics in Tokyo, Japan. 40 competitors, 37 men and 3 women, took part in 46 events in 7 sports.

It competed as "Taiwan" in this competition. The International Olympic Committee (IOC) required the ROC (which under Chiang Kai-shek asserted that it was the lawful government of China) to compete as Taiwan.

In subsequent years pressure from the People’s Republic of China on sports organizations has caused Taiwan to compete as Chinese Taipei as per the Nagoya Resolution.

Athletics

Boxing

Cycling

Four cyclists represented Taiwan in 1964.

Individual road race
 Her Jong-chau
 Shue Ming-shu
 Deng Chueng-hwai

Team time trial
 Deng Chueng-hwai
 Her Jong-chau
 Shue Ming-shu
 Yang Rong-hwa

1000m time trial
 Shue Ming-shu

Gymnastics

Judo

Shooting

Six shooters represented Taiwan in 1964.

25 m pistol
 Ma Chen-shan

300 m rifle, three positions
 Wu Tao-yan

50 m rifle, three positions
 Wu Tao-yan

50 m rifle, prone
 Pan Kou-ang
 Tai Chao-chih

Trap
 Lin Ho-ming
 Lin Wen-chu

Weightlifting

Notes

References

External links
Official Olympic Reports

Nations at the 1964 Summer Olympics
1964
1964 in Taiwanese sport